Timothy Clement Smyth  (February 24, 1810 – September 22, 1865) was an Irish born 19th century bishop of the Catholic Church in the United States. He served as the second bishop of the Diocese of Dubuque following the death of Mathias Loras.

Biography

Early life and ministry
Timothy Smyth was born on February 24, 1810, in Finlea, County Clare, Ireland.  He was educated at Trinity College, Dublin.  Smyth initially entered a community of teaching brothers, the Brothers of the Presentation.  He left that community after six years and took the name of Clement when he entered Mount Melleray Abbey in 1838.  He professed religious vows as a member of the Order of Cistercians of the Strict Observance, also known as the Trappists.  He was ordained a priest at the abbey on May 29, 1841.  Father Smyth founded a school for boys at Mount Melleray and another school developed outside the abbey gates for girls.  Because of the devastation brought about by the Great Famine in Ireland in the 1840s the community started looking for a place in North America for a new abbey where the monks could farm the land.  A place near Bedford, Pennsylvania was acquired and Father Smyth, as prior, along with another monk were sent to establish a new monastery.  The property was deemed unsuitable, as well as other property the small community looked at in both the United States and Canada.  Eventually they came to the Dubuque, Iowa area where the Trappists were invited to establish a monastery in the diocese by Mathias Loras, Bishop of Dubuque. After resigning as prior, Smyth again established a school at New Melleray according to Loras' wishes. He was again appointed prior of the monastery on December 6, 1849.

Coadjutor bishop
Loras realized that his health was failing and he requested a coadjutor bishop from the Holy See. On January 9, 1857, Pope Pius IX named Smyth the Titular Bishop of Thennesus and Coadjutor Bishop of Dubuque. Because of the time involved in sending communications, the papers from Rome did not arrive in Dubuque until April, 1857. On May 9, 1857, Smyth was consecrated by Peter Richard Kenrick, Archbishop of St. Louis. John Henni, Bishop of Milwaukee, and Anthony O'Regan, Bishop of Chicago, served as co-consecrators.

Shortly after his episcopal consecration, Smyth was assigned administrator of the Diocese of Chicago while O'Reagan went to Rome to resign his see.  For the six months he served in this position, he resided in Dubuque and traveled to Chicago by train.  He had to deal with an apostate priest, Charles Paschal Chiniquy, who had set up a schismatic church in Kankakee, Illinois. Smyth was shot at as he left the town after he publicly excommunicated Chiniquy.

 
After his consecration as bishop, Smyth directed the construction of the present St. Raphael's Cathedral. Loras' health continued to decline, but he was well enough to hold the first Mass in the new cathedral on Christmas Day, 1857. Just under two months later, Loras died, February 20, 1858. On that day, Smyth succeeded Loras as the second bishop of Dubuque.

Bishop of Dubuque
Smyth was known for his deep piety and boundless charity.  He would oversee the continued expansion of the church's presence in Iowa as immigration continued into the state.   Because of difficult economic times and the American Civil War, not much progress was made on building new churches.  However, he was able to recruit Irish priests to the diocese, primarily from All Hallows College in Dublin.  This caused discontent among the French born priests and many of them left the diocese.  A happier occasion for Smyth occurred in 1863 when he consecrated Ephraim McDonnell as the first abbot for New Melleray after it had been elevated to an abbey by the Holy See.

During the Civil War, Dubuque was a center of pro-Confederate sympathies.  
In 1863 Smyth learned of the existence of the pro-Southern Knights of the Golden Circle. He gave Iowa members who might be Catholic two weeks to withdraw from the organization or be automatically excommunicated.

One of the most outspoken critics of President Lincoln and the abolitionists was the editor of the local Democratic newspaper and a friend and an advisor to Loras, Dennis A. Mahoney. Smyth, unlike Loras who had spent many years as a missionary in Alabama and as a slaveholder, supported the Union cause. Smyth preached a stinging sermon after the assassination of Abraham Lincoln.  That evening Smyth lost his coach house, carriage and horses to an arsonist.  Local citizens, both Catholic and Protestant, built a new coach house and bought a new carriage and a pair of horses for the bishop.

Smyth led the diocese for seven years until his death on September 22, 1865.  He was succeeded by John Hennessy, who became Dubuque's first archbishop. Before his death in 1900, Hennessy requested that a mortuary chapel be built to serve as a final resting place for bishops and archbishops of Dubuque.  In 1902 the mortuary chapel was completed. Smyth's body was brought to the cathedral, and reburied in the mortuary chapel.

References

External links
 

1810 births
1865 deaths
19th-century Roman Catholic bishops in the United States
Irish emigrants to the United States (before 1923)
People from County Clare
Roman Catholic bishops of Dubuque
Trappist bishops